Dar Gur (also Romanized as Dar Gūr) is a village in Khamir Rural District, in the Central District of Khamir County, Hormozgan Province, Iran. At the 2006 census, its population was 1,153, in 282 families.

References 

Populated places in Khamir County